Ty-Cooke Farmhouse, Mamhilad, Monmouthshire is a large farmhouse dating from 1710. The farmhouse forms a group with an earlier farmhouse, dating from circa 1600. The main farmhouse was constructed for Thomas Cooke, the manager of the Hanbury ironworks at Pontypool.  The farmhouse is Grade II* listed, while the old farm, and the wall and gate to the property have their own Grade II Listings.

History
The farmhouse was built for Thomas Cooke, across a yard from the original farmhouse. At some point in the 19th century, the old farmhouse was converted to agricultural use. Ty-Cooke was subject to "unfortunate(.)" renovations in the 19th/20th centuries, including pebbledashing of the walls and reconstruction of the roof.

Architecture and description
The architectural historian John Newman describes the approach to the new farmhouse, through the listed wall and gate, as "inviting". The construction is of Old Red Sandstone rubble. The interior contains a "lusciously carved" marble chimneypiece that comes from Maindiff Court, Abergavenny. Ty-Cooke Farmhouse is a Grade II* listed building.

Notes

References 
 

Grade II* listed buildings in Monmouthshire
Country houses in Wales